Estara (sometimes stylized as E s t a r a or E S T A R A) is the second studio album by Teebs. It was released on Brainfeeder on April 8, 2014. It features guest appearances from Jonti, Populous, Prefuse 73, and Lars Horntveth.

Critical reception

At Metacritic, which assigns a weighted average score out of 100 to reviews from mainstream critics, the album received an average score of 68, based on 14 reviews, indicating "generally favorable reviews".

Nate Patrin of Pitchfork gave the album a 6.7 out of 10, writing, "Melancholy, bucolic relaxation, and agitated giddiness all run through this record, but its emotionally calming effect comes at the expense of anything truly revelatory or exciting." Tony Naylor of Resident Advisor gave the album a 3.5 out of 5, commenting that "Teebs employs dusty library music samples, astringent drones, twinkling percussion, punchy hip-hop drums and woody, autumnal tones to create defiantly utopian music."

Track listing

Charts

References

External links
 

2014 albums
Brainfeeder albums
Instrumental hip hop albums
Hip hop albums by American artists